Zero to Hero (previously known as On Your Mom, Get Set, Go!) is a 2021 Hong Kong biographical sports drama film directed by Jimmy Wan.
The film is based on the true story of medal-winning Paralympian So Wa Wai, who overcame personal and physical struggles with the help of his mother to emerge a winner.

The film has its premium at Far East Film Festival at Udine on 1 July 2021 and was later released in Hong Kong on August 12, 2021.

The film was selected as the Hong Kong entry for the Best International Feature Film at the 94th Academy Awards.

Plot
A biographical film about So Wa Wai, Hong Kong's first athlete to win gold at the Paralympic Games.

Cast
 Louis Cheung 		
 Siu-ho Chin
 Chung-hang Leung
 Hoi-pang Lo
 Sandra Ng

Reception
The review aggregator website Rotten Tomatoes reported a 100% approval rating, based on 5 reviews with an average rating of 6.1/10.

Awards and nominations

See also
 List of submissions to the 94th Academy Awards for Best International Feature Film
 List of Hong Kong submissions for the Academy Award for Best International Feature Film

References

External links
 
 

2021 films
2021 drama films
2020s Cantonese-language films
Hong Kong drama films
Films about the Paralympics
Films shot in Athens